The following highways are numbered 789:

Canada
 Alberta Highway 789 (former)
 Saskatchewan Highway 789

United States
 U.S. Route 789 (former proposal)
 Arizona State Route 789 (former)
 Colorado State Highway 789 (former)
 Florida State Road 789
 County Road 789 (Manatee County, Florida)
 County Road 789 (Sarasota County, Florida)
 County Road 789A (Sarasota County, Florida)
 Georgia State Route 789 (former proposal)
 Louisiana Highway 789
 Mississippi Highway 789
Montana Highway 789 (former)
 Nevada State Route 789
 New Mexico State Road 789 (former)
 Farm to Market Road 789
 Virginia State Route 789
 Wyoming Highway 789